Electoral district XI (Croatian: XI. izborna jedinica) is one of twelve electoral districts of Croatian Parliament.

Electorate  

Special electoral district for election representatives by Croatian citizens who do not reside in Croatia.

The election system worked at the start on proportional representation basis as the number of sea were awarded depending on voters turnout in correlation with average turnout in Croatia. The total number of valid votes of voters in ten constituencies in the Republic of Croatia is divided by 140, which is the total number of representatives elected in those constituencies. The number of valid votes in a special electoral unit is divided by the obtained result (quotient). The result obtained is the number of representatives elected in a special electoral unit. If the result is not a whole number, it is rounded to a whole number from 0.5 up, and below 0.5 down. 

In 2010 Election law was changed granting three seat, no matter of turnout.

Voting countries:

x – data incomplete

Election

2000 Elections 
 

HDZ
 Milan Kovač
 Zdenka Babić-Petričević
 Ljubo Ćesić-Rojs
 Zdravka Bušić
 Ante Beljo
 Krunoslav Kordić

2003 Elections 
 

HDZ
 Zdenka Nediljka Babić Petričević
 Florijan Boras
 Krešimir Ćosić
 Ivan Bagarić

2007 Elections 
 

HDZ
 Dragan Primorac
 Ivo Andrić
 Ivan Bagarić
 Dragan Vukić
 Rade Bošnjak

2011 Elections 
 

HDZ
 Ilija Filipović
 Milijan Brkić
 Perica Jelečević

2015 Elections 

HDZ
 Željko Glasnović
 Božo Ljubić
 Ivan Šuker

2016 Elections 

HDZ
 Božo Ljubić
 Željko Raguž

Independent Željko Glasnović
 Željko Glasnović

2020 Elections 
 

HDZ
 Nevenko Barbarić
 Radoje Vidović
 Zdravka Bušić

References 

Electoral districts in Croatia